Klim Sergeyevich Kostin (born 5 May 1999) is a Russian professional ice hockey winger who currently plays for the Edmonton Oilers of the National Hockey League (NHL). Considered a top prospect for the 2017 NHL Entry Draft, Kostin was selected 31st overall by the St. Louis Blues, and made his NHL debut with them in 2019. Kostin previously played for Dynamo Moscow and Avangard Omsk of the KHL. Internationally Kostin has played for the Russian national junior team at several tournaments.

Playing career
Kostin debuted for HC MVD in the Junior Hockey League (MHL) during the 2015–16 season. In 30 games for the team he scored 8 goals and 13 assists.

Kostin was selected first overall in the 2016 CHL Import Draft by the Kootenay Ice of the Western Hockey League (WHL), a major junior league in Canada, but he decided to stay in Russia with Dynamo Moscow for the 2016–17 season. He was reluctant to play on a junior team in North America, instead preferring to play for a senior team, either in the NHL or American Hockey League (AHL), the top minor league affiliate for the NHL.

Kostin only played 18 games in the 2016–17 season, split between Dynamo Moscow and their junior league affiliate Dynamo Balashikha, scoring one goal before he had to end his season due to shoulder surgery in January. Despite this, he was ranked the No. 1 European skater by NHL Central Scouting, stating he has proved in earlier viewings that he has the necessary tools to excel at the next level. He was described as close to a complete package with a good combination of size and mobility. Kostin was also described as a power forward, one who was both able to score and help others score.

Through playing a limited number of games, Kostin was taken with the last pick in the first round of the 2017 NHL Entry Draft by the St. Louis Blues. Initially thought to continue developing in Russia, Kostin was made a free agent after Dynamo Moscow were forced to release all of their players through a violation of KHL rules on 4 July 2017. The following day, Kostin agreed to a three-year entry-level contract with the St. Louis Blues. Kostin has said that he would prefer to play in the NHL for the 2017–18 season, though would not oppose going to the American Hockey League (AHL), the top minor league affiliate for the NHL; however he had no interest in playing in the WHL, or any junior league.

Kostin scored his first career NHL goal with the St. Louis Blues during the  season on November 23, 2019, in a 4–2 loss to the Nashville Predators.

Approaching the  season, his sixth year within the Blues organization, Kostin was unable to clinch a role on the opening night roster and was placed on waivers before he was re-assigned to AHL affiliate, the Springfield Thunderbirds. On 9 October 2022, Kostin was traded by the Blues to the Edmonton Oilers in exchange for fellow Russian, Dmitri Samorukov. He was immediately re-assigned by the Oilers to continue in the AHL with affiliate, the Bakersfield Condors. On November 9th, 2022, Kostin was called up to the Oilers after left winger Evander Kane was injured. He scored his first goal with the Oilers in a 5-3 loss to the Minnesota Wild on December 1, 2022.

International play

 

 

Kostin made his international debut at the 2016 IIHF World U18 Championships, serving as captain of the Russian U-18 team. He recorded four assists in five games as the team finished sixth. Later that year he participated in the 2016 Ivan Hlinka Memorial Tournament, an under-18 tournament not sanctioned by the International Ice Hockey Federation but considered a top tournament for the age group. Again captain of the team, he had four goals and three assists in five games as the team won a bronze medal. He also played in the CHL Canada/Russia Series, an annual tournament between CHL All-Star teams and the Russian national junior team, scoring two points in five games.

Personal life
Kostin was born and raised in Penza. His family owns a butcher shop in the city. At the age of 12 Kostin moved to Moscow, living with his grandmother, in order to further his hockey career, and enrolled in the Dynamo Moscow program.

Career statistics

Regular season and playoffs

International

Awards and honors

References

External links

1999 births
Living people
Avangard Omsk players
Bakersfield Condors players
Dynamo Balashikha players
HC Dynamo Moscow players
Edmonton Oilers players
Sportspeople from Penza
Russian ice hockey forwards
National Hockey League first-round draft picks
San Antonio Rampage players
Springfield Thunderbirds players
St. Louis Blues draft picks
St. Louis Blues players